Pōmare IV (28 February 1813 – 17 September 1877), more properly ʻAimata Pōmare IV Vahine-o-Punuateraʻitua (otherwise known as ʻAimata – "eye-eater", after an old custom of the ruler to eat the eye of the defeated foe), was the Queen of Tahiti between 1827 and 1877. She was the fourth monarch of the Kingdom of Tahiti.

Family 
Pōmare was the daughter of Pōmare II and Teriʻitoʻoterai Tere-moe-moe, his second wife. Her grandfather was Pōmare I.

She succeeded as ruler of Tahiti after the death of her brother Pōmare III when she was only 14 years old.

Biography 
In 1843, the French declared Tahiti a French protectorate and installed a governor at Papeete. She fought in vain against French intervention, writing to the King Louis Philippe I of France and Queen Victoria, asking in vain for British intervention, and exiling herself to Raiatea in protest. What followed was the bloody French-Tahitian War which lasted from 1843 to 1847, involving every kingdom of the Society Islands. The Tahitians suffered many casualties, but the French losses were also great. Although the British never assisted the Tahitians, they actively condemned France and war nearly broke between the two powers in the Pacific. These conflicts ended in the defeat of the Tahitian forces at the Fort of Fautaua. The French were victorious, but they weren't able to annex the island due to diplomatic pressure from Great Britain, so Tahiti and Moorea continued to be ruled under the French protectorate. A clause to the war settlement was that Queen Pōmare's allies in Huahine, Raiatea, and Bora Bora would be allowed to remain independent.

Pōmare IV eventually relented and ruled under the French administration from 1847 until 1877. She attempted to install her children in positions of power in Tahiti and the Leeward Islands. Three of her children were to become monarchs in their own right: King Pōmare V of Tahiti (r. 1877–1880), Queen Teriʻimaevarua II of Bora Bora (r. 1860–1873), King Tamatoa V of Raiatea-Tahaa (r. 1857–1871).

Pōmare IV died on 17 September 1877. She is buried in the Royal Mausoleum, Papaʻoa, ʻArue. She was succeeded by Pōmare V, who reigned 1877–1880.

Issue 
In December 1822, Pōmare married the future King Tapoa II of Taha'a and Bora Bora. In 1830, Tahiti was visited by HMS Seringapatam, and her captain William Waldegrave noted in his diary with some surprise that Pōmare was then sixteen years old and married but had no children. The marriage remained childless and ended with the Queen repudiating it on the ground that Tapoa was sterile.

On 5 December 1832, Pōmare was married again, this time to her first cousin, Tenaniʻa Ariʻifaʻaite a Hiro (10 January 1820 – 6 August 1873). By her second husband, she had issue:

 A boy (1833, died young), died of dysentery
 Henry Pōmare (August 1835, died young)., died of dysentery
 Ariʻiaue Pōmare (12 August 1838 – 10 May 1856), Crown Prince of Tahiti, Ariʻi of Afaʻahiti.
 Pōmare V (3 November 1839 – 12 June 1891), succeeded as King of Tahiti.
 Teriʻimaevarua II (23 May 1841 – 12 February 1873), succeeded as Queen of Bora Bora.
 Tamatoa V (23 September 1842 – 30 September 1881), succeeded as King of Ra'iātea and Taha'a.
 Victoria Pōmare-vahine (1844 – June 1845).
 Punuariʻi Teriʻitapunui Pōmare (20 March 1846 – 18 September 1888), Ariʻi of Mahina and President of the Tahitian High Court.
 Teriʻitua Tuavira Pōmare (17 December 1847 – 9 April 1875), Ariʻirahi of Hitiaʻa, called the "Prince of Joinville".
 Tevahitua Pōmare (1850/1852, died young).

Ancestry

References

Bibliography

Further reading

Succession 

Pōmare dynasty
Tahitian monarchs
Modern child monarchs
Protestant monarchs
Converts to Protestantism
French Polynesian Protestants
Pomare IV
Pomare IV
19th-century women rulers
Tahitian women